In 2023, Kent County Cricket Club will compete in the 2023 County Championship, the 2023 One-Day Cup and the 2023 T20 Blast. The season will be the seventh in charge for head coach, and former player, Matthew Walker. Sam Billings retained the club captaincy that he was first awarded in 2018. Ryan ten Doeschate left his position as batting coach after a single season with Kent, to take up a role with the Kolkata Knight Riders. Former Worcestershire head coach joined Kent as a replacement for ten Doeschate.

Squad

Departures
On 29 July 2022, Matt Milnes signed a contract to join Yorkshire at the end of the season. In August it was announced that Darren Stevens would be released at the end of the season after 17 years with Kent. Stevens played over 630 games for Kent, scored more than 28,000 runs and took almost 900 wickets. On 23 September 2022, the club announced that wicketkeeper-batsman Ollie Robinson would be leaving the club at the end of the season to join Durham. In November 2022, Harry Podmore signed for Glamorgan.

Arrivals
On 30 July 2022, Kent signed 20 year-old Joey Evison from Nottinghamshire, initially on loan for the One-Day Cup before joining on a three-year contract from the start of the 2023 season. In October 2022, Harry Finch signed a two-year contract to run until the end of the 2024 season. Finch had previously had short spells with Kent in 2021 season when the squad had been severely affected by COVID-19. and again in 2022 season as cover for a number of players absent due to injuries and The Hundred.

In November 2022, Kent signed Australian veteran Michael Hogan. Hogan had originally planned to retire at the end of the 2022 season, which was his tenth year with Glamorgan. In December 2022, Kent announced that Australian international fast-bowler Kane Richardson as an overseas player for the 2023 T20 Blast.

Squad list
 Ages given as of the first day of the County Championship, 6 April 2023.

County Championship

Division One

One-Day Cup

Group B

T20 Blast

South Group

References

External links
Kent home at ESPN cricinfo
Kent County Cricket Club official site

2023
2023 in English cricket